Murtagh Morgan (fl. 1925–1981) was a trade unionist and Irish republican politician.

Morgan lived in Belfast and had a Roman Catholic background.  In the 1920s, he became a republican labour activist in the Northern Ireland Labour Party (NILP), claiming to act in the spirit of James Connolly.  By 1925, he had become the President of the Belfast section of the Irish Transport and General Workers' Union.  By the 1930s, he was Chairman of the union, and was active on Belfast Trades Council.  He supported the Republican Congress initiative, started in 1934.  During this period, he was close to the Socialist Party of Northern Ireland faction of the NILP.

At some point Morgan left the NILP, and at the 1953 Northern Ireland general election, he was elected as the Irish Labour Party MP for Belfast Dock.  He stood down at the 1958 general election, and Gerry Fitt stood as the group's candidate.

Morgan nominated Albert Price as in independent Irish republican candidate for Belfast West at the February 1974 general election  He was also named as a possible Republican Labour Party candidate in Belfast North, but in the event the party disbanded and did not stand any candidates.

References

Year of birth missing
Year of death missing
Labour Party (Ireland) members of the House of Commons of Northern Ireland
Irish republicans
Irish trade unionists
Members of the House of Commons of Northern Ireland 1953–1958
Northern Ireland Labour Party politicians
Members of the House of Commons of Northern Ireland for Belfast constituencies